Draquinolol is a beta blocker with selectivity for the β1 receptor.

References

Beta blockers
Tert-butyl compounds